Tants aurukatla ümber (eng. lit "Dance Around the Steam Boiler") is a novel by Estonian author Mats Traat. It was first published in 1971.

The novel contains five chapters, wherein the "dance" illuminates five distinct eras of country life in 20th century Estonia, and changes in the country's rural life throughout.

Television film
The novel, originally a film scenario, was adapted into a television movie by director Peeter Simm in 1987 for  Eesti Televisioon (ETV), with cinematography by Ago Ruus, music by Erkki-Sven Tüür. It stars Heino Mandri, Rudolf Allabert, Egert Soll, Arvo Kukumägi, Jüri Järvet, Kärt Kross, Ita Ever, Sulev Luik, Paul Poom, Kaljo Kiisk, Inga-Kai Puskar, Uve Urbla, Liina Tennosaar, Tarvo Hanno Varres, Lennart Mänd, Laine Mägi, and Aire Koop.

The movie was filmed during the eras of perestroika and glasnost, and stays faithful to the book.

With Mats Traat's input, the film gained a sixth and penultimate 'dance', which depicts the late-1980s Soviet period. The chapter shows the old age and warmth of the main characters to the background of cold rural scenes typical of the '80s: industrial and technological development combined with waste and reckless harm wielded on the environment.

The film enjoys a special place in Estonian historiography and culture.

Estonian novels
1963 novels